Klaas Roelof Veenhof (born 9 November 1935, in Groningen) is a Dutch Assyriologist and professor at the University of Leiden. He has specialized in the Old-Babylonian time and the Old-Assyrian trade colonies such as Kanesh.

Selected bibliography 
 Altassyrische Tontafeln aus Kultepe Berlin : Mann (1992 )
 Geschichte des Alten Orients bis zur Zeit Alexanders des Grossen Göttingen: Vandenhoeck & Ruprecht  (2001 )
 The Old Assyrian list of year eponyms from Karum Kanish and its chronological implications Ankara : Turkish Historical Society (2003 )

References

1935 births
Living people
Dutch Assyriologists
Leiden University alumni
Academic staff of Leiden University
Scientists from Groningen (city)
Assyriologists